KKBL 95.9 FM is a radio station licensed to Monett, Missouri.  The station broadcasts an Adult Hits format and is owned by Eagle Broadcasting, Inc.

References

External links
KKBL's website

KBL
Adult hits radio stations in the United States